Trent Ormond-Allen (born 11 June 1976) is a former Australian rules footballer who played with Melbourne and Adelaide in the Australian Football League (AFL) during the 1990s.

Melbourne secured Ormond-Allen with the tenth pick of the 1993 AFL draft, from South Australian National Football League (SANFL) club Port Adelaide. A half-back, he broke into the seniors just once in 1995 and after playing just seven further games in 1996 was traded to Adelaide for pick 83 in the draft, Ashley Gehling.

Ormond-Allen played 18 AFL games in 1997, including a semi final and preliminary final but missed the Grand Final due to glandular fever. Adelaide made another grand final in 1998 and Ormond-Allen, despite making 15 appearances in the home and away season, once again missed out on selection. He was de-listed at the end of 2000, after not playing a senior game all season.

References

External links
 Demon Wiki profile
 
 

1976 births
Melbourne Football Club players
Adelaide Football Club players
Port Adelaide Magpies players
Living people
Australian rules footballers from South Australia